This article describes the history of cricket in Pakistan from the 1985–86 season to 1999–2000.

Events
Pakistan won the 1992 Cricket World Cup, beating England by 22 runs in the final at the Melbourne Cricket Ground on 25 March 1992.

Notable Pakistan players in this period include Javed Miandad, Imran Khan, Inzamam-ul-Haq, Mushtaq Ahmed, Waqar Younis, Wasim Akram and Saqlain Mushtaq.

National championships
Winners of the Qaid-i-Azam Trophy from 1986 to 2000 were:
 1985–86 – Karachi
 1986–87 – National Bank
 1987–88 – PIA
 1988–89 – ADBP
 1989–90 – PIA
 1990–91 – Karachi Whites
 1991–92 – Karachi Whites
 1992–93 – Karachi Whites
 1993–94 – Lahore City
 1994–95 – Karachi Blues
 1995–96 – Karachi Blues
 1996–97 – Lahore City
 1997–98 – Karachi Blues
 1998–99 – Peshawar
 1999–2000 – PIA

Winners of the BCCP Patron's Trophy from 1986 to 2000 were:
 1985–86 – Karachi Whites
 1986–87 – National Bank
 1987–88 – Habib Bank
 1988–89 – Karachi
 1989–90 – Karachi Whites
 1990–91 – ADBP
 1991–92 – Habib Bank
 1992–93 – Habib Bank
 1993–94 – ADBP
 1994–95 – Allied Bank
the trophy was renamed the PCB Patron's Trophy in 1995
 1995–96 – ADBP
 1996–97 – United Bank
 1997–98 – Habib Bank
 1998–99 – Habib Bank
 1999–2000 – Lahore City Blues

Winners of the limited overs knockout tournament from 1986 to 2000 were:
the trophy was called the Wills Cup until 1998
 1985–86 – PIA
 1986–87 – Habib Bank
 1987–88 – PIA
 1988–89 – United Bank
 1989–90 – Habib Bank
 1990–91 – Habib Bank
 1991–92 – Habib Bank
 1992–93 – National Bank
 1993–94 – Habib Bank
 1994–95 – National Bank
 1995–96 – PIA
 1996–97 – Allied Bank
 1997–98 – Allied Bank
the trophy was renamed the Tissot Cup in 1998
 1998–99 – Allied Bank
 1999–2000 – PIA
the trophy was renamed the One Day National Tournament in 2000

International tours of Pakistan

Sri Lanka 1985–86
 1st Test at Iqbal Stadium, Faisalabad – match drawn	
 2nd Test at Jinnah Stadium, Sialkot – Pakistan won by 8 wickets
 3rd Test at National Stadium, Karachi – Pakistan won by 10 wickets

West Indies 1986–87
 1st Test at Iqbal Stadium, Faisalabad – Pakistan won by 186 runs
 2nd Test at Gaddafi Stadium, Lahore – West Indies won by an innings and 10 runs
 3rd Test at National Stadium, Karachi – match drawn

England 1987–88
 1st Test at Gaddafi Stadium, Lahore – Pakistan won by an innings and 87 runs
 2nd Test at Iqbal Stadium, Faisalabad – match drawn	
 3rd Test at National Stadium, Karachi – match drawn

Australia 1988–89
 1st Test at National Stadium, Karachi – Pakistan won by an innings and 88 runs
 2nd Test at Iqbal Stadium, Faisalabad – match drawn	
 3rd Test at Gaddafi Stadium, Lahore – match drawn	

For more details of this tour, see : Australian cricket team in Pakistan in 1988–89

India 1989–90
 1st Test at National Stadium, Karachi – match drawn
 2nd Test at Iqbal Stadium, Faisalabad – match drawn
 3rd Test at Gaddafi Stadium, Lahore – match drawn
 4th Test at Jinnah Stadium, Sialkot – match drawn

New Zealand 1990–91
 1st Test at National Stadium, Karachi – Pakistan won by an innings and 43 runs
 2nd Test at Gaddafi Stadium, Lahore – Pakistan won by 9 wickets
 3rd Test at Iqbal Stadium, Faisalabad – Pakistan won by 65 runs

West Indies 1990–91
 1st Test at National Stadium, Karachi – Pakistan won by 8 wickets
 2nd Test at Iqbal Stadium, Faisalabad – West Indies won by 7 wickets
 3rd Test at Gaddafi Stadium, Lahore – match drawn

Sri Lanka 1991–92
 1st Test at Jinnah Stadium, Sialkot – match drawn	
 2nd Test at Jinnah Stadium, Gujranwala – match drawn	
 3rd Test at Iqbal Stadium, Faisalabad – Pakistan won by 3 wickets

West Indies 1991–92

Zimbabwe 1993–94
 1st Test at Defence Housing Authority Stadium, Karachi – Pakistan won by 131 runs
 2nd Test at Rawalpindi Cricket Stadium – Pakistan won by 52 runs
 3rd Test at Gaddafi Stadium, Lahore – match drawn

Australia 1994–95
 1st Test at National Stadium, Karachi – Pakistan won by 1 wicket
 2nd Test at Rawalpindi Cricket Stadium – match drawn	
 3rd Test at Gaddafi Stadium, Lahore – match drawn	

For more details of this tour, see : Australian cricket team in Pakistan in 1994–95

Sri Lanka 1995–96
 1st Test at Arbab Niaz Stadium, Peshawar – Pakistan won by an innings and 40 runs
 2nd Test at Iqbal Stadium, Faisalabad – Sri Lanka won by 42 runs
 3rd Test at Jinnah Stadium, Sialkot – Sri Lanka won by 144 runs

New Zealand 1996–97
 1st Test at Gaddafi Stadium, Lahore – New Zealand won by 44 runs
 2nd Test at Rawalpindi Cricket Stadium – Pakistan won by an innings and 13 runs

For more details of this tour, see : New Zealand cricket team in Pakistan in 1996–97

Zimbabwe 1996–97
 1st Test at Sheikhupura Stadium – match drawn	
 2nd Test at Iqbal Stadium, Faisalabad – Pakistan won by 10 wickets

England 1997–98

South Africa 1997–98
 1st Test at Rawalpindi Cricket Stadium – match drawn	
 2nd Test at Sheikhupura Stadium – match drawn	
 3rd Test at Iqbal Stadium, Faisalabad – South Africa won by 53 runs

West Indies 1997–98
 1st Test at Arbab Niaz Stadium, Peshawar – Pakistan won by an innings and 19 runs
 2nd Test at Rawalpindi Cricket Stadium – Pakistan won by an innings and 29 runs
 3rd Test at National Stadium, Karachi – Pakistan won by 10 wickets

Australia 1998–99
 1st Test at Rawalpindi Cricket Stadium – Australia won by an innings and 99 runs	
 2nd Test at Arbab Niaz Stadium, Peshawar – match drawn		
 3rd Test at National Stadium, Karachi – match drawn		

For more details of this tour, see : Australian cricket team in Pakistan in 1998–99

England 1998–99

Asian Test Championship 1998–99
 Pakistan v Sri Lanka at Gaddafi Stadium, Lahore – match drawn		
 Pakistan v Sri Lanka at Bangabandhu National Stadium, Dhaka – Pakistan won by an innings and 175 runs	

For more details of this tournament, see : 1998–99 Asian Test Championship

Zimbabwe 1998–99
 1st Test at Arbab Niaz Stadium, Peshawar – Zimbabwe won by 7 wickets	
 2nd Test at Gaddafi Stadium, Lahore – match drawn		
 3rd Test at Iqbal Stadium, Faisalabad – game abandoned due to persistent rain; no toss was made

Sri Lanka 1999–2000
 1st Test at Rawalpindi Cricket Stadium – Sri Lanka won by 2 wickets
 2nd Test at Arbab Niaz Stadium, Peshawar – Sri Lanka won by 57 runs
 3rd Test at National Stadium, Karachi – Pakistan won by 222 runs

Bibliography
 First Class Cricket in Pakistan (5 volumes) by Abid Ali Kazi
 Playfair Cricket Annual
 Wisden Cricketers Almanack (annual)

External sources
 CricketArchive – List of Tournaments in Pakistan

1986